Scourge, in comics, may refer to:

Scourge of the Underworld, an organization responsible for the deaths of numerous supervillains
 Jack Monroe, a character temporarily brainwashed into being an agent of the organization, using the name, Scourge
Scourge, a member of the Thunderbolts during Dark Reign, who is revealed to be Nuke (Marvel Comics)

See also
Skurge, the Executioner, an Asgardian supervillain
Scourge (disambiguation)

References